Mid-Ulster Hospital is an acute general hospital in Magherafelt, County Londonderry, Northern Ireland. It is managed by the Northern Health and Social Care Trust.

History
The hospital has its origins in the Magherafelt Union Workhouse and Infirmary which was designed by George Wilkinson and completed in 1842. A fever hospital was built on the site in 1847. The infirmary became Magherafelt and District Hospital in August 1945 and subsequently evolved to become the Mid-Ulster Hospital. In February 2003 the hospital was designated as one of the nine acute hospitals in the acute hospital network of Northern Ireland on which healthcare would be focused under the government health policy 'Developing Better Services'. The maternity department closed in 2006 and the accident & emergency department was closed and replaced with a minor injuries unit in 2010.

References

Further reading

External links

Northern Health and Social Care Trust
Hospitals established in 1842
1842 establishments in Ireland
Health and Social Care (Northern Ireland) hospitals
Poor law infirmaries
Hospitals in County Londonderry